The McGirr ministry (1950–1952) or Third McGirr ministry was the 54th ministry of the New South Wales Government, and was led by the 28th Premier, Jim McGirr, of the Labor Party. The ministry was the third and final of three consecutive occasions when the government was led by McGirr, as Premier.

McGirr was first elected to the New South Wales Legislative Assembly in 1922 and served continuously until 1952, holding the various seats of Cootamundra, Cumberland, Bankstown, and Liverpool. Having served in the third ministry of Jack Lang, and the first and second ministries of William McKell, McGirr was variously torn between Lang Labor and the newly formed Australian Labor Party. When McKell stood aside as Premier in 1947 in order to take up an appointment as Governor-General of Australia, McGirr was elected Labor Leader and became Premier. McGirr led Labor to victory at the 1947 state election. Labor lost its majority at the 1950 state election and had to rely upon the support of two independent members, James Geraghty and John Seiffert, who had been expelled from Labor as a result of voting against the party ticket in the 1949 election for the Legislative Council. Seiffert was subsequently re-admitted to the Labor party

This ministry covers the period from 30 May 1950 until 2 April 1952 when McGirr resigned as Premier in favour of his deputy Joe Cahill.

Composition of ministry

The composition of the ministry was announced by Premier McGirr following the election held on 30 May 1950, and covers the period up until 2 April 1952.

 
Ministers are members of the Legislative Assembly unless otherwise noted.

See also

References

 

! colspan="3" style="border-top: 5px solid #cccccc" | New South Wales government ministries

New South Wales ministries
1950 establishments in Australia
1952 disestablishments in Australia
Australian Labor Party ministries in New South Wales